USS Leary (DD-158) was a  in the United States Navy during World War II. She was named for Lieutenant Clarence F. Leary, posthumously awarded the Navy Cross in World War I.

Commissioned in 1919, she saw a number of fleet exercises and training cruises, as well as a brief period of decommissioning from 1922 to 1930. She was the first U.S. Navy ship to be equipped with sonar, and the first to detect a German ship with it. With the outbreak of World War II, she escorted a number of convoys to Iceland, the Caribbean, and west Africa to support the war effort, later being upgraded to serve as an anti-submarine warfare vessel.

Design and construction 

Leary was one of 111 s built by the United States Navy between 1917 and 1919. She, along with nine of her sisters, were constructed at New York Shipbuilding Corporation shipyards in Camden, New Jersey using specifications and detail designs drawn up by Bethlehem Steel.

She was armed with four 4"/50 caliber guns, two 3"/23 caliber guns, and twelve  torpedo tubes. She had a regular crew complement of 176 officers and enlisted men. She was driven by two Curtis steam turbines powered by four Yarrow boilers.

Specifics on Learys performance are not known, but she was one of the group of Wickes-class destroyers known unofficially as the 'Liberty Type' to differentiate them from the destroyers constructed from detail designs drawn up by Bath Iron Works, which used Parsons or Westinghouse turbines. The 'Liberty' type destroyers deteriorated badly in service, and in 1929 all 60 of this group were retired by the Navy. The class also suffered problems with turning and weight.

She was the first ship to be named for Clarence F. Leary. A subsequent  would be commissioned, this one a  completed in 1945.

Service history
Leary was laid down on 6 March 1918 and launched on 18 December 1918. She was sponsored by Mrs. Anne Leary, the mother of Clarence F. Leary. She was commissioned on 5 December 1919.

She departed Boston on 28 January 1920, underwent her shakedown cruise in the Caribbean and then conducted training operations along the East Coast of the United States. In January 1921, she joined the Pacific Battle Fleet, and through February took part in a large-scale battle exercise off the coast of Peru. In March, Leary transited the Panama Canal and reported to the commander of Naval Station Guantanamo Bay, Cuba. She then was on station during bombing tests conducted by the U.S. Army Air Forces against naval targets, overseen by Billy Mitchell. She resumed her training exercises off the Caribbean until June 1922, when in accordance with the Washington Naval Conference, she was decommissioned at the Philadelphia Naval Yard.

Recommissioned on 1 May 1930 with a home port in Newport, Rhode Island, Leary alternated between the Pacific Fleet and the Atlantic Fleet, carrying out training maneuvers and taking part in several fleet problems. After 1935, most of her time was taken up conducting training cruises for reserves and midshipmen. In April 1937, she underwent a shipyard overhaul, including being equipped with a radar. Leary was the first U.S. navy vessel to be equipped with the device. In September 1939, Leary and  established a continuous patrol off the coast of New England against German U-boats. On 9 September 1941, she began escort missions to Iceland. She was also the first to make contact with a German U-boat, while escorting a British convoy in the North Atlantic on 9 November 1941.

With the entry of the United States into World War II following the Japanese attack on Pearl Harbor, Leary undertook regular convoy escort duties. After 26 February 1942, she spent a year escorting convoys from a mid-ocean meeting point to Icelandic ports. On 7 February 1943, she left for Boston and reassignment. During this time, she was given a shipyard overhaul at Boston Navy Yard and converted into an anti-submarine warfare ship. She then resumed escort duty, and made several trips to Trinidad and several Caribbean ports. Returning to New York on 25 June, she began escorting transatlantic convoys, and successfully escorted two of them through Aruba and to Algiers and Casablanca. She later joined Task Group 21.41 under the command of Captain Arnold J. Isbell and escorting .

On 24 December 1943, the task group was caught in a storm in the North Atlantic when at 01:58 in the morning, Leary made a ping on a U-boat off her starboard bow. The torpedo struck her starboard side and detonated in the after engine room, killing all of the men there and damaging both propeller shafts. She quickly developed a 20 degree list to starboard, and was unable to move in the heavy seas. Unbeknownst to the task group, a second German submarine,  fired at Leary but missed. Soon after, Kyes ordered the crew to abandon ship. Two additional torpedoes from U-275 rocked the ship, and it rapidly sank, stern first. She took 98 men with her, including Kyes. Survivors were picked up by her sister ship, .

Three or four minutes after the second torpedo hit, the executive officer, Lt. R. B. Watson, concluded a quick inspection of the ship, during which he found a thick, gooey substance covering the deck.  He was astonished to see two seamen sitting on a torpedo tube, calmly eating Boston cream pie. The cook had just baked a batch, the explosion spattering most of it on the deck.

Leary received one battle star for her service in World War II. For his actions in ensuring the safety of his crew, Kyes was posthumously awarded the Navy Cross. The Gearing-class destroyer  was later named for him.

Convoys escorted

Resources

Notes

Sources

External links
 navsource.org: USS Leary
 Booklet of General Plans circa 1941 at Researcher@Large

 

Wickes-class destroyers
Ships built by New York Shipbuilding Corporation
Ships sunk by German submarines in World War II
World War II destroyers of the United States
World War II shipwrecks in the Atlantic Ocean
1918 ships
Maritime incidents in December 1943